Pavel Zhuravlev (Ukrainian: Павло Журавльов, Pavlo Zhuravlov; Russian: Павел Журавлёв; born July 27, 1983) is a Ukrainian kickboxer and boxer. He is the former Interim GLORY Light Heavyweight Champion, the 2012 SUPERKOMBAT World Grand Prix Tournament Champion, the 2013 Legend Fighting Show -93 kg Tournament Champion and the 2012 K-1 World Grand Prix Final Semifinalist.

As of February 2021, Zhuravlev is ranked the #4 light-heavyweight in the world by Combat Press. He first entered the Light Heavyweight rankings in October 2015.

Biography and career

Early career
After graduation from the  Nakhimov Naval Academy in Sevastopol Zhuravlev is since 2010 lieutenant in the Ukrainian Navy.

After winning various tournaments in the WBKF, a Russian kickboxing circuit, Pavel made his K-1 debut on August 2, 2009 at K-1 World Grand Prix 2009 in Seoul against Gokhan Saki and won by decision.

On December 16, 2010, he took part in the 16-man tournament at KOK World GP 2010 in Moscow and went on to win the Grand Prix by defeating Prince Ali, Evgeny Orlov and Alexey Kudin.

SUPERKOMBAT
On October 1, 2011, Pavel Zhuravlev advanced to Superkombat World Grand Prix Final in Darmstadt, Germany, joining Sergei Lascenko and Ismael Londt. Zhuravlev won the third event of the series from Brăila, Romania, defeating Ricardo van den Bos and Sebastien van Thielen via unanimous decisions.

He faced Saulo Cavalari in a non-tournament bout at the K-1 World Grand Prix 2012 in Tokyo Final 16 on October 14, 2012 and won via unanimous decision.
 
He won a unanimous decision over Freddy Kemayo on November 10, 2012 in Craiova, Romania at the SuperKombat World Grand Prix 2012 Final Elimination, which is the quarter-finals of the SuperKombat World Grand Prix 2012.

He fought Benjamin Adegbuyi in the semi-finals at the SuperKombat World Grand Prix 2012 Final on December 22, 2012 in Bucharest and won the fight by KO after 25 seconds. In the final, Zhuravlev rematched Ismael Londt. This time the outcome was reversed as Zhuravlev became champion after extra round unanimous decision.

K-1 and FFC
Despite having not qualified for the tournament, Zhuravlev replaced Makoto Uehara to fight at the K-1 World Grand Prix 2012 Final on March 15, 2013 in Zagreb, Croatia. After defeating Cătălin Moroşanu by unanimous decision in the quarter-finals, he was eliminated by the eventual winner, Mirko Cro Cop, by the same margin in the semis.

He earned first round TKO victory over Luca Panto at Final Fight Championship 3: Jurković vs. Cătinaș in Split, Croatia on April 19, 2013.

He lost to Hesdy Gerges by unanimous decision at Final Fight Championship 6 in Poreč, Croatia on June 14, 2013.

He won the -93 kg/205 lb tournament at Legend 2: Invasion in Moscow, Russia on November 9, 2013. After TKOing Sahak Parparyan in round one in the semi-finals, he was set to face Zabit Samedov in the final but Samedov was forced to withdraw due to a cut and was replaced by Agron Preteni. He also beat Preteni by TKO, this time in round two.

He rematched Benjamin Adegbuyi at the SuperKombat World Grand Prix 2013 Final in Galați, Romania on December 21, 2013, losing by third round KO.

Following the 2014 Russian annexation of Crimea Zhuravlev moved to  Odessa and continued his career in the Ukrainian navy.

GLORY
Zhuravlev was expected to face Tomasz Szczepkowski at Legend 3: Pour Homme in Milan, Italy on April 5, 2014 but Szczepkowski withdrew for undisclosed reasons and was replaced by fellow Pole Michal Turynski two days before the fight. Zhuravlev defeated Turynski via majority decision.

Zhuravlev faced Saulo Cavalari of Brazil in the headline event at Glory 43 Super Fight Series on July 14, 2017 at The Theater at Madison Square Garden in New York. Zhuravlev defeated Cavalari via unanimous decision (30–26, 30–26, and 29–27).

Zhuravlev fought once in 2018, against Myron Dennis, during Glory 52. He won the fight by unanimous decision.

Other promotions
Pavel was scheduled to fight Iraj Azizpour on August 24, 2019. Azizpour was later replaced by Mehmet Ozer. He beat Ozer by a second round low kick TKO.

Zhuravlev was set to take part in an FEA Heavyweight Grand Prix, in February 2021. Instead of taking part in the grand prix, he was scheduled to fight Cristian Ristea at FEA: Reset on March 13, 2021, for the FEA Heavyweight title. However, Zhuravlev pulled out of the fight citing a bicep injury. He was replaced by Kirill Kornilov.

Titles

Kickboxing
FEA Fights
 2019 interim FEA Heavyweight Champion.

Glory
 2017 Interim Glory Light Heavyweight Champion.

Final Fight Championship
 2016 FFC Light Heavyweight Championship (-95 kg)

Legend Fighting Show
 2013 Legend Fighting Show -93 kg tournament champion

K-1
2012 K-1 World Grand Prix Final semifinalist

SUPERKOMBAT Fighting Championship
 2012 SUPERKOMBAT World Grand Prix Tournament champion
 2011 SUPERKOMBAT World Grand Prix III champion

King of Kings
 2010 KOK World GP 2010 in Moscow champion

W5 Professional Kickboxing
 2009 W5 (+96 kg) Heavyweight champion 
 2009 W5 Grand Prix tournament champion

World BARS Kickboxing Federation
 2009 WBKF European Heavyweight champion (-93 kg)
 2009 WBKF World Super Heavyweight champion (+93 kg)
 2008 WBKF World Super Heavyweight champion (+93 kg)
 2008 WBKF European Super Heavyweight champion (+93 kg)
 2007 WBKF European Heavyweight champion (-93 kg)
 2006 WBKF European Cruiserweight (86 kg) title
 2005 SNG (WBKF) Kickboxing Heavyweight champion (-93 kg)

Gladiators of Ukraine
 2007 Gladiators of Ukraine - Lviv K-1 Grand Prix champion 

SNG
 2006 SNG Thaiboxing Heavyweight (91 kg) title

King's Cup
 2004 King's Cup at Bangkok, Thailand champion

Boxing
 2012 Bigger’S Better 13 tournament runner-up
 2010 Bigger’S Better 1 tournament runner-up

Fight record

|-  style="background:#cfc;"
| 2019-08-26 || Win ||align=left| Mehmet Özer || FEA World GP || Odessa, Ukraine || TKO (low kick) || 2 || 
|-
! style=background:white colspan=9 | 
|- 
|-  style="background:#cfc;"
| 2018-03-31 || Win ||align=left| Myron Dennis || Glory 52: Los Angeles || Los Angeles, United States || Decision (unanimous) || 3 || 3:00
|-
|-  bgcolor="#CCFFCC"  
| 2017-07-14 || Win ||align=left| Saulo Cavalari|| Glory 43: New York || New York City, New York || Decision (unanimous) || 3 || 3:00
|-
! style=background:white colspan=9 | 
|-
|-  bgcolor="#CCFFCC"  
| 2016-11-05 || Win ||align=left| Zinedine Hameur-Lain|| Glory 35: Nice || Nice, France || TKO (punches) || 1 || 1:55
|-
|-  bgcolor="#FFBBBB" 
| 2016-07-22 || Loss ||align=left| Ariel Machado || Glory 32: Virginia, Semi Finals || Norfolk, Virginia, USA || Decision (unanimous) || 3 ||  3:00
|-
|-  bgcolor="#CCFFCC" 
| 2016-06-10 || Win ||align=left| Benjamin Fuimaono || FFC 25: Mitchell vs Lopez || Springfield, Massachusetts, USA || TKO (punches) || 1 ||  2:15
|-
|-  bgcolor="#CCFFCC" 
| 2016-02-19 || Win ||align=left| Brian Douwes || FFC22: Athens || Athens, Greece || TKO || 3 || N/A
|-
! style=background:white colspan=9 |
|-
|-  bgcolor="#CCFFCC" 
| 2015-12-19 || Win ||align=left| Nouh Chahboune || KOK World GP 2015 in Moldova || Chisinau, Moldova || KO || 3 || 2:59
|-
|-  bgcolor="#CCFFCC" 
| 2015-09-26 || Win ||align=left| Freddy Kemayo || KOK World GP 2015 - Heavyweight Tournament, Quarter Finals || Chisinau, Moldova || KO || 3 || 2:59
|-
|-  bgcolor="#CCFFCC" 
| 2014-11-28 || Win ||align=left| Kryspin Kalski  || KOK World GP 2014 || Płock, Poland || Decision (unanimous) || 3 || 3:00
|-
|-  bgcolor="#CCFFCC" 
| 2014-09-19 || Win ||align=left| Vladimir Toktasynov || KOK World GP 2014 in Chișinău || Chișinău, Moldova || Decision (unanimous) || 3 || 3:00
|-
|-  bgcolor="#CCFFCC"
| 2014-04-05 || Win ||align=left| Michał Turyński || Legend 3: Pour Homme || Milan, Italy || Decision (majority) || 3 || 3:00
|-
|-  bgcolor="#FFBBBB"
| 2013-12-21 ||  Loss ||align=left| Benjamin Adegbuyi || SUPERKOMBAT World Grand Prix 2013 Final || Galati, Romania || KO (right hook) || 3 || 1:20
|-  bgcolor="#CCFFCC"
| 2013-11-08 || Win ||align=left| Agron Preteni || Legend 2: Invasion, Final || Moscow, Russia || TKO (left hook) || 2 || 0:46
|- 
! style=background:white colspan=9 |
|-
|-  bgcolor="#CCFFCC"
| 2013-11-08 || Win ||align=left| Sahak Parparyan || Legend 2: Invasion, Semi Finals || Moscow, Russia || TKO (punches) || 1 || 2:36
|-
|-  bgcolor="#FFBBBB"
| 2013-06-14 || Loss ||align=left| Hesdy Gerges || FFC06: Jurković vs. Poturak || Poreč, Croatia || Decision (unanimous) || 3 || 3:00
|-
|-  bgcolor="#CCFFCC"
| 2013-05-24 || Win ||align=left| Vinchenzo Renfurm || FFC05: Rodriguez vs. Simonjič || Osijek,Croatia || KO (right hook) || 2 || 0:13
|-  bgcolor= "#CCFFCC"
| 2013-04-18 || Win ||align=left| Luca Panto || FFC03: Jurković vs. Cătinaș || Split, Croatia || TKO (referee stoppage) || 1 || 1:30  
|-
|-  bgcolor="#FFBBBB"
| 2013-03-15 || Loss ||align=left| Mirko Cro Cop || K-1 World Grand Prix 2012 Final, Semi Finals || Zagreb, Croatia || Decision (unanimous) || 3 || 3:00
|-  bgcolor="#CCFFCC"
| 2013-03-15 || Win ||align=left| Cătălin Moroşanu || K-1 World Grand Prix 2012 Final, Quarter Finals || Zagreb, Croatia || Decision (unanimous) || 3 || 3:00
|-  bgcolor="#CCFFCC"
| 2012-12-22 || Win ||align=left| Ismael Londt || SUPERKOMBAT World Grand Prix 2012 Final, Final || Bucharest, Romania || Ext. R Decision (unanimous) || 4 || 3:00
|-
! style=background:white colspan=9 |
|-
|-  bgcolor="#CCFFCC"
| 2012-12-22 || Win ||align=left| Benjamin Adegbuyi || SUPERKOMBAT World Grand Prix 2012 Final, Semi Finals || Bucharest, Romania || KO (left hook) || 1 || 0:25
|-  bgcolor="#CCFFCC"
| 2012-11-10 || Win ||align=left| Freddy Kemayo || SUPERKOMBAT World Grand Prix 2012 Final Elimination, Quarter Finals || Craiova, Romania || Decision (unanimous) || 3 || 3:00
|-  bgcolor="#CCFFCC"
| 2012-10-14 || Win ||align=left| Saulo Cavalari || K-1 World Grand Prix 2012 in Tokyo Final 16 || Tokyo, Japan || Decision (unanimous) || 3 || 3:00
|-  bgcolor="#FFBBBB"
| 2011-11-19 || Loss ||align=left| Ismael Londt || SUPERKOMBAT World Grand Prix 2011 Final, Semi Finals || Darmstadt, Germany || Ext. R Decision || 4 || 3:00
|-  bgcolor="#CCFFCC"
| 2011-10-01 || Win ||align=left| Sebastien van Thielen || SUPERKOMBAT World Grand Prix III 2011, Final || Brăila, Romania || Decision (unanimous) || 3 || 3:00 
|-
! style=background:white colspan=9 |
|-
|-  bgcolor="#CCFFCC"
| 2011-10-01 || Win ||align=left| Ricardo van den Bos || SUPERKOMBAT World Grand Prix III 2011, Semi Finals || Brăila, Romania || Decision (unanimous) || 3 || 3:00 
|-
|-  bgcolor="#FFBBBB"
| 2011-05-28 || Loss ||align=left| Igor Jurković || United Glory 14: 2010-2011 World Series Finals || Moscow, Russia || TKO (doctor stoppage) || 2 || 0:20
|-  bgcolor="#CCFFCC"
| 2010-12-16 || Win ||align=left| Alexey Kudin || KOK World GP 2010 in Moscow, final || Odintsovo, Russia || 2 Ext. R Decision (split) || 5 || 3:00 
|-
! style=background:white colspan=9 |
|-
|-  bgcolor="#CCFFCC"
| 2010-12-16 || Win ||align=left| Evgeny Orlov || KOK World GP 2010 in Moscow, semi final || Odintsovo, Russia || TKO (right low kick) || 1 || 0:46
|-  bgcolor="#CCFFCC"
| 2010-12-16 || Win ||align=left| Prince Ali || KOK World GP 2010 in Moscow, quarter final || Odintsovo, Russia || TKO (referee stoppage) || 2 || 2:25 
|-  bgcolor="#FFBBBB" 
| 2010-09-19 || Loss ||align=left| Nathan Corbett || Domination 5 || Perth, Australia || KO (knee strike) || 4 || N/A
|-
! style=background:white colspan=9 |
|-
|-  bgcolor="#c5d2ea"
| 2010-04-17 || Draw ||align=left| Alexei Kudin || Big8 Grand Prix "European Selection" || Kharkiv, Ukraine || Draw || 3 || 3:00 
|-  bgcolor="#CCFFCC"
| 2009-10-31 || Win ||align=left| Mourad Bouzidi || W5 Grand Prix 2009 Ryazan || Ryazan, Russia || Decision (unanimous) || 3 || 3:00 
|-
! style=background:white colspan=9 |
|-
|-  bgcolor="#CCFFCC"
| 2009-08-02 || Win ||align=left| Gökhan Saki || K-1 World Grand Prix 2009 in Seoul || Seoul, Korea || Decision (unanimous) || 3 || 3:00 
|-  bgcolor="#CCFFCC"
| 2009-07-11 || Win ||align=left| Mehmet Özer || W5 Grand Prix Heavyweight tournament || Solnechnogorsk, Russia || TKO || 3 || N/A 
|-
! style=background:white colspan=9 |
|-
|-  bgcolor="#CCFFCC"
| 
|-
|-  bgcolor="#CCFFCC"
| 2009-07-11 || Win ||align=left| Evgeny Angalevich || W5 Grand Prix Heavyweight tournament || Solnechnogorsk, Russia || Decision (unanimous) || 3 || 3:00 
|-
|-  bgcolor="#CCFFCC"
| 2009-04-23 || Win ||align=left| Evgeny Angalevich || WBKF Europe Tournament (-93 kg) @ Club Arbat || Moscow, Russia || Decision (unanimous) || 3 || 3:00
|-
! style=background:white colspan=9 |
|-
|-  bgcolor="#CCFFCC"
| 2009-04-23 || Win ||align=left| Elvin Abbasov || WBKF Europe Tournament (-93 kg) @ Club Arbat || Moscow, Russia || Decision (unanimous) || 3 || 3:00 
|-  bgcolor="#CCFFCC"
| 2009-03-26 || Win ||align=left| Konstantin Gluhov || WBKF World Tournament (+93 kg) @ Club Arbat || Moscow, Russia || Decision (unanimous) || 3 || 3:00 
|-
! style=background:white colspan=9 |
|-
|-  bgcolor="#CCFFCC"
| 2009-03-26 || Win ||align=left| Alexei Kudin || WBKF World Tournament (+93 kg) @ Club Arbat || Moscow, Russia || Decision (unanimous) || 3 || 3:00 
|-  bgcolor="#CCFFCC"
| 2009-01-31 || Win ||align=left| Elvin Abbasov || Tatneft Cup 2009 3rd selection for 1/8 final || Kazan, Russia || TKO || 3 || N/A
|-  bgcolor="#FFBBBB"
| 2008-12-17 || Loss ||align=left| Konstantin Gluhov || Warrior's Honor-3. Final || Kharkiv, Ukraine || Decision (unanimous) || 4 || 3:00 
|-
! style=background:white colspan=9 |
|-
|-  bgcolor="#CCFFCC"
| 2008-12-17 || Win ||align=left| Dmytro Borulko || Warrior's Honor-3. Final || Kharkiv, Ukraine || Decision (unanimous) || 3 || 3:00 
|-  bgcolor="#CCFFCC"
| 2008-12-17 || Win ||align=left| Serhiy Lashchenko || Warrior's Honor-3. Final || Kharkiv, Ukraine || Decision (unanimous) || 3 || 3:00 
|-  bgcolor="#CCFFCC"
| 2008-10-30 || Win ||align=left| Alexei Kudin || WBKF European Tournament (+93 kg) @ Club Arbat || Moscow, Russia || Decision (majority) || 3 || 3:00 
|-
! style=background:white colspan=9 |
|-
|-  bgcolor="#CCFFCC"
| 2008-10-30 || Win ||align=left| Nicolas Wamba || WBKF European Tournament (+93 kg) @ Club Arbat || Moscow, Russia || Decision (unanimous) || 3 || 3:00 
|-  bgcolor="#CCFFCC"
| 2008-05-29 || Win ||align=left| Alexei Kudin || WBKF World Tournament (+93 kg) @ Club Arbat || Moscow, Russia || Decision (split) || 3 || 3:00 
|-
! style=background:white colspan=9 |
|-
|-  bgcolor="#CCFFCC"
| 2008-05-29 || Win ||align=left| Karim Lyadzissi || WBKF World Tournament (+93 kg) @ Club Arbat || Moscow, Russia || Decision (unanimous) || 3 || 3:00
|-  bgcolor="#CCFFCC"
| 2008-04-04 || Win ||align=left| Konstantin Gluhov || Warrior's Honor-3. 1st Qualifikation || Kharkiv, Ukraine || Decision (unanimous) || 3 || 3:00
|-
! style=background:white colspan=9 |
|-
|-  bgcolor="#CCFFCC"
| 2008-04-04 || Win || N/A || Warrior's Honor-3. 1st qualification || Kharkiv, Ukraine || N/A || N/A || N/A
|-  bgcolor="#CCFFCC"
| 2008-04-04 || Win || N/A || Warrior's Honor-3. 1st qualification || Kharkiv, Ukraine || N/A || N/A || N/A
|-  bgcolor="#CCFFCC"
| 2008-02-08 || Win || N/A || Warrior's Honor-2. Final || Kharkiv, Ukraine || N/A || N/A || N/A
|-
! style=background:white colspan=9 |
|-
|-  bgcolor="#CCFFCC"
| 2008-02-08 || Win || N/A || Warrior's Honor-2. Final || Kharkiv, Ukraine || N/A || N/A || N/A
|-  bgcolor="#CCFFCC"
| 2008-02-08 || Win || N/A || Warrior's Honor-2. Final || Kharkiv, Ukraine || N/A || N/A || N/A
|-  bgcolor="#CCFFCC"
| 2007-12-19 || Win ||align=left| Maksym Neledva || WBKF European Tournament Final(-93 kg) @ Club Arbat || Moscow, Russia || Decision (unanimous) || 3 || 3:00
|-
! style=background:white colspan=9 |
|-
|-  bgcolor="#CCFFCC"
| 2007-11-07 || Win ||align=left| Vladimir Popov || WBKF European Tournament SemiFinal(-93 kg) @ Club Arbat || Moscow, Russia || Decision (unanimous) || 3 || 3:00 
|-  bgcolor="#CCFFCC"
| 2007-10-12 || Win ||align=left| Ceyhun Safarov || A-1 World Combat Cup || Ankara, Turkey || Decision (unanimous) || 3 || 3:00 
|-  bgcolor="#CCFFCC"
| 2007-10-03 || Win ||align=left| Vitali Oparin || WBKF European Tournament QuarterFinal(-93 kg) @ Club Arbat || Moscow, Russia || Decision (unanimous) || 3 || 3:00 
|-  bgcolor="#CCFFCC"
| 2007-05-19 || Win ||align=left| Dzhavatkhan Atakov || Battle of Champions || Moscow, Russia || TKO (referee stoppage) || 3 || N/A  
|-  bgcolor="#CCFFCC"
| 2007-04-26 || Win ||align=left| Andriy Yembalayev || Gladiators of Ukraine - Lviv K-1 Grand Prix, final || Lviv, Ukraine || TKO (referee stoppage) || 3 || 00:30
|-
! style=background:white colspan=9 |
|-
|-  bgcolor="#CCFFCC"
| 2007-04-26 || Win ||align=left| Andrey Osadchiy || Gladiators of Ukraine - Lviv K-1 Grand Prix, semi final || Lviv, Ukraine || Decision (unanimous) || 3 || 3:00 
|-  bgcolor="#CCFFCC"
| 2007-04-26 || Win ||align=left| Olexander Skripka || Gladiators of Ukraine - Lviv K-1 Grand Prix, quarter final || Lviv, Ukraine || TKO (high kick) || 1 || 01:55 
|-  bgcolor="#FFBBBB"
| 2007-04-18 || Loss ||align=left| Alexei Kudin || WBKF European Tournament (+93 kg) @ Club Arbat || Moscow, Russia || Decision (split) || 3 || 3:00 
|-  bgcolor="#CCFFCC"
| 2007-02-23 || Win ||align=left| Andriy Yembalayev || Star Ring || Kharkiv, Ukraine || Decision (unanimous) || 3 || 3:00 
|-  bgcolor="#CCFFCC"
| 2007-01-04 || Win ||align=left| Andrei Sen || Fight Club Arbat || Moscow, Russia || KO || 3 || N/A
|-  bgcolor="#CCFFCC"
| 2006-12-15 || Win ||align=left| Denys Liadovyi || Warrior's Honor-2. 1st Qualifikation || Kharkiv, Ukraine || N/A || 1 || N/A
|-
! style=background:white colspan=9 |
|-
|-  bgcolor="#CCFFCC"
| 2006-12-15 || Win || N/A || Warrior's Honor-2. 1st Qualifikation || Kharkiv, Ukraine || N/A || N/A || N/A
|-  bgcolor="#CCFFCC"
| 2006-12-15 || Win || N/A || Warrior's Honor-2. 1st Qualifikation || Kharkiv, Ukraine || N/A || N/A || N/A
|-  bgcolor="#CCFFCC"
| 2006-08-19 || Win ||align=left| Andriy Yembalayev || Arhat Cup @ Club "Solnyshko" || Evpatoria, Ukraine ||  Decision (unanimous) || 4 || 3:00
|-  bgcolor="#CCFFCC"
| 2006-08-02 || Win ||align=left| Dimitri Antonenko || SNG (WBKF) Kickboxing champion(-93 kg) @ Club Arbat || Moscow, Russia || KO || 4 || N/A 
|-
! style=background:white colspan=9 |
|-
|-  bgcolor="#CCFFCC"
| 2006-08-02 || Win ||align=left| Artem Yashnov || SNG Thaiboxing champion(-91 kg) @ Club Arbat || Moscow, Russia || TKO || 3 || N/A 
|-
! style=background:white colspan=9 |
|-
|-  bgcolor="#FFBBBB"
| 2006-04-26 || Loss ||align=left| Maksym Neledva || WBKF World Heavyweight (-93 kg) @ Club Arbat || Moscow, Russia || TKO || 6 || N/A
|-
! style=background:white colspan=9 |
|-
|-  bgcolor="#CCFFCC"
| 2006-03-01 || Win ||align=left| Yevgeni Gubar || WBKF European champion(86 kg) @ Club Arbat || Moscow, Russia || TKO || 4 || N/A 
|-
! style=background:white colspan=9 |
|-
|-  bgcolor="#CCFFCC"
| 2006-02-17 || Win ||align=left| Andriy Kyndrych || Warrior's Honor-1. Final || Kharkiv, Ukraine || Decision || 3 || 3:00 
|-
! style=background:white colspan=9 |
|-
|-  bgcolor="#CCFFCC"
| 2006-02-17 || Win ||align=left| Dmytry Popov || Warrior's Honor-1. Final || Kharkiv, Ukraine || N/A || 1 || N/A
|-  bgcolor="#CCFFCC"
| 2006-02-17 || Win ||align=left| Stanislav Bilokon || Warrior's Honor-1. Final || Kharkiv, Ukraine || Decision || 3 || 3:00 
|-  bgcolor="#CCFFCC"
| 2005-12-21 || Win ||align=left| Salim Abakarov || Fight Club Arbat || Moscow, Russia || Decision (unanimous) || 3 || 3:00 
|-  bgcolor="#CCFFCC"
| 2005-10-26 || Win ||align=left| Andriy Kyndrych || Fight Club Arbat || Moscow, Russia || Decision (unanimous) || 3 || 3:00 
|-  bgcolor="#CCFFCC"
| 2005-07-27 || Win ||align=left| Nikolai Savin || SNG (WBKF) Kickboxing champion(-93 kg) @ Club Arbat || Moscow, Russia || Decision (unanimous) || 3 || 3:00 
|-
! style=background:white colspan=9 |
|-
|-  bgcolor="#CCFFCC"
| 2005-06-29 || Win ||align=left| Ruslan Baklanov || Fight Club Arbat || Moscow, Russia || KO || 1 || N/A
|-  bgcolor="#CCFFCC"
| 2005-05-00 || Win || N/A || Warrior's Honor-1. 1st Qualifikation || Kharkiv, Ukraine || N/A || N/A || N/A
|-
! style=background:white colspan=9 |
|-
|-  bgcolor="#CCFFCC"
| 2005-05-00 || Win || N/A || Warrior's Honor-1. 1st Qualifikation || Kharkiv, Ukraine || N/A || N/A || N/A
|-  bgcolor="#CCFFCC"
| 2005-05-00 || Win || N/A || Warrior's Honor-1. 1st Qualifikation || Kharkiv, Ukraine || N/A || N/A || N/A

|-  bgcolor=FFBBBB
| 2012-07-06 || Loss ||align=left| Mairis Briedis || Monte Caputo, Final || Limassol, Cyprus || SD || 4 || 3:00 || 11–2
|-
! style=background:white colspan=9 |
|-  bgcolor=CCFFCC
| 2012-07-06 || Win ||align=left| Panagiotis Diakos || Monte Caputo, Semifinal || Limassol, Cyprus || TKO || 2 || N/A || 11–1
|-  bgcolor=CCFFCC
| 2012-07-06 || Win ||align=left| Kamil Małysz || Monte Caputo, Quarterfinal || Limassol, Cyprus || TKO || 1 || N/A || 10–1
|-  bgcolor=CCFFCC
| 2012-04-26 || Win ||align=left| Vitaliy Neveselyy || Sportpalace || Kharkiv, Ukraine || UD || 8 || 3:00 || 9–1
|-  bgcolor=CCFFCC
| 2011-04-27 || Win ||align=left| Ihor Pylypenko || Sportpalace || Kharkiv, Ukraine || TKO || 5 || N/A || 8–1
|-  bgcolor="#FFBBBB"
| 2010-05-07 || Loss ||align=left| Mairis Briedis || Pavilion Nicosia, Final || Nicosia, Cyprus || UD || 3 || 3:00|| 7–1
|-
! style=background:white colspan=9 |
|-
|-  bgcolor="#CCFFCC"
| 2010-05-07 || Win ||align=left| Gbenga Oloukun || Pavilion Nicosia, Semifinal || Nicosia, Cyprus || UD || 3 || 3:00 || 7–0
|-  bgcolor="#CCFFCC"
| 2010-05-07 || Win ||align=left| Miodrag Petkovic || Pavilion Nicosia, Quarterfinal || Nicosia, Cyprus || TKO || 1 || 1:47 || 6–0
|-  bgcolor="#CCFFCC"
| 2009-05-24 || Win ||align=left| Oleh Rohatinov || Sport Club of National University of Shipbuilding || Mykolaiv, Ukraine || UD || 6 || 3:00 || 5–0
|-  bgcolor="#CCFFCC"
| 2008-09-05 || Win ||align=left| Andriy Kindrich || State Naval Institute || Sevastopol, Ukraine || UD || 6 || 3:00 || 4–0
|-  bgcolor="#CCFFCC"
| 2008-06-29 || Win ||align=left| Ivan Bohdanov || Sportpalace Lokomotyv || Kharkiv, Ukraine || TKO || 4 || N/A || 3–0
|-  bgcolor="#CCFFCC"
| 2008-04-05 || Win ||align=left| Vladimir Kurtsev || Sportpalace Lokomotyv || Kharkiv, Ukraine || TKO || 1 || N/A || 2–0
|-  bgcolor="#CCFFCC"
| 2007-11-15 || Win ||align=left| Ruslan Ivanenko || Sportpalace Lokomotyv || Kharkiv, Ukraine || TKO || 2 || 2:24 || 1–0
|-  bgcolor="#ffbbbb"
|-
| colspan=9 | Legend:

See also
 List of K-1 events
 List of K-1 champions
 List of male kickboxers

References

External links
 Official K-1 Website

Living people
1983 births
Ukrainian male kickboxers
Heavyweight kickboxers
Cruiserweight boxers
People from Saky
Ukrainian people of Russian descent
Ukrainian male boxers
Ukrainian military personnel
Glory kickboxers
SUPERKOMBAT kickboxers